Binghamton City School District is the public school district for the city of Binghamton, New York.

 about 5,000 students in total were enrolled in the district. In the 2017 and 2018 school years, 60% of students were minorities, and slightly more than half were eligible for free or reduced lunch.

Board of education
The Board of Education (BOE) consists of 7 members who serve rotating 5-year terms. Elections are held each May for board members and to vote on the School District Budget.

Current board members are:
Brian Whalen - President 
Korin Kirk - Vice President
Tim Ames
Liz Rosenberg
David Hawley 
Steve Seepersaud

List of schools

Elementary schools
Benjamin Franklin Elementary School (K-5)
Calvin Coolidge Elementary School (K-5)
Horace Mann Elementary School (K-5)
MacArthur Elementary School (K-5)
Theodore Roosevelt Elementary School (K-5)
Thomas Jefferson Elementary School (K-5)
Woodrow Wilson Elementary School (K-5)

Middle schools
East Middle (Junior High) School (6-8)
West Middle (Junior High) School (6-8)

High school
Binghamton High School (9-12)

See also
List of school districts in New York

References

External links

Education in Broome County, New York
School districts in New York (state)